Suvorov Glacier is a glacier, 5 nautical miles (9 km) wide, flowing east from the Wilson Hills and discharging into the sea south of Northrup Head and Belousov Point. Mapped by the Soviet Antarctic Expedition, 1958, and named after V.S. Suvorov, Soviet mechanic who perished in the Arctic.

See also
Heth Ridge

References

Glaciers of Pennell Coast
Glaciers of Oates Land